The women's long jump at the 2015 World Championships in Athletics was held at the Beijing National Stadium on 27 and 28 August.  Defending champion Brittney Reese returned but was unable to get out of the qualification round.  Katarina Johnson-Thompson could have used her 6.79 automatic qualifier in her heptathlon earlier in the week, 6.79 meters further than she received credit for.

In the first round of the final, Christabel Nettey took the early lead with a 6.95.  Janay DeLoach Soukup pulled into second with a 6,67 while most of the field struggled to find the board.  Ivana Španović then popped 7.01 for a new Serbian National Record.  World #1 Tianna Bartoletta put out a 6.95 in the second round to almost pull even with Nettey.  Bartoletta's third round 6.87 narrowly broke the tie to briefly put her into second place.  On the last jump of the third round Shara Proctor jumped 7.07 for a new British Record and the lead.  Nobody made any improvements in the fourth and fifth rounds.  On her final attempt, Bartoletta leaped a world leading 7.14 to take the lead.  Španović then duplicated her 7.01 but no improvement.  When Proctor fouled her final attempt, the medals were settled.

Records
Prior to the competition, the established records were as follows.

Qualification standards

Schedule

Results

Qualification
Qualification: 6.75 m (Q) and at least 12 best (q) advanced to the final.

Final
The final was started at 19:50

References

Long jump
Long jump at the World Athletics Championships
2015 in women's athletics